Screen Anarchy, previously known as Twitch Film or Twitch, is a Canadian English-language website featuring news and reviews of mainly international, independent and cult films. The website was founded in 2004 by Todd Brown. In addition to films, the website covers various film festivals from Sundance, Toronto and Fantasia to Sitges, Cannes and the Berlinale.  They partnered with Instinctive Film in 2011 to found Interactor, a crowd funding and viral marketing site, and with Indiegogo in 2013.  Brown is a partner at XYZ Films, and Variety credits Twitch Film as helping to popularize the production company's films.

Brad Miska of Bloody Disgusting wrote that Twitch "...quickly established itself as the online world’s leading source for international, independent, cult, arthouse and genre film news, review and discussion." He also wrote: "Over the years I have become increasingly impressed by what Todd Brown has done with Twitch Film, he has cornered the market for all edgy international releases and has given life to foreign films that might never have seen the light here in the States." Ain't It Cool News has linked to Twitch Film pages on multiple occasions and UGO.com quoted a Twitch editor among its list of "critics" at its appearance at Sundance 2010.

Screen Anarchy has a large body of writers who reside in most major film markets in the world, including the United States, Canada, Hong Kong, South Korea, Japan, Australia and the United Kingdom.

Key personnel
 Todd Brown - Founder and Editor
 Peter Martin - Managing Editor
 Andrew Mack - Editor, News
 Ard Vijn - Editor, Europe
 Benjamin Umstead - Editor, U.S.
 J. Hurtado - Editor, U.S.
 James Marsh - Editor, Asia
 Kwenton Bellette - Editor, Australia
 Michelle "Izzy" Galgana - Editor, U.S.
 Ryland Aldrich - Editor, Festivals
 Shelagh Rowan-Legg - Editor, Canada
 Christopher Bourne - Featured Critic
 Diva Vélez - Featured Contributor
 Dustin Chang - Featured Critic
 Jim Tudor - Featured Critic

References

External links

Canadian film websites
English-language websites
Magazines established in 2004
2004 establishments in Canada